Poupart can refer to:
Alfred Poupart (1876-1963), French archer who competed at the 1908 Summer Olympics in London
Brigitte Poupart, Canadian actress and filmmaker
Chaiyapol Julien Poupart (born 1990), Thai actor and model
François Poupart (1661–1708) French physician, anatomist, entomologist, who described:
Poupart's ligament, another name for the inguinal ligament in anatomy
Henri-Pierre Poupart or Henri-Pierre Poupard, renamed himself Henri Sauguet, (1901-1989), French composer
Henri Poupart-Lafarge (born 1969), French business executive
Jean Frédéric André Poupart de Neuflize (1850 – 1928), French banker and equestrian
Roberte Ponsonby, Countess of Bessborough, née Poupart de Neuflize (1892–1979), French noblewoman
 Samuel Poupart, English owner of the land that became:
Shaftesbury Park Estate which is served by the rail junction:
 Susan "Suzy" Poupart (1960–1990) victim in the Murder of Susan Poupart

See also